D/O Varma is a 2013 Indian Telugu language film directed by Khaja.

Cast
 Vennela Kishore as Rao Gopal Warma 
Naveena Jackson as Deeksha 
Roja as Ganga
Jogi Naidu as Rambabu
Dhanraj
Jeeva
Shankar Melkote

Release
The movie was released on 15 May 2013.

Reception
A critic from The Times of India wrote that "Director Khaja explores a subject that is not of the routine nature. It describes emotions that are more valuable than riches. Perhaps it is not something that can be called a popular subject but it sure can be described as meaningful cinema".

References

2013 films
2010s Telugu-language films